Ribble Weldtite Pro Cycling was a UCI Continental team, that was founded in 2017 by Jack Rees. The team registered with the UCI for the 2019 season. The team will fold due to sponsorship issues for the 2023 season and the foreseeable future.

Team roster

Major results
2019
Grand Prix des Marbriers, Damien Clayton
2022
Rutland–Melton CiCLE Classic, Finn Crockett

References

External links

Cycling teams established in 2017
UCI Continental Teams (Europe)
Cycling teams based in the United Kingdom